Ex tempore (Latin for "out of the moment“) is a legal term that means 'at the time'. A judge who hands down a decision in a case soon or straight after hearing it is delivering a decision ex tempore. Another way a judge may deliver a decision is to reserve their decision and deliver it later in written form. An ex tempore judgment, being off the cuff, does not entail the same preparation as a reserved decision. Consequently, it will not be thought out to the same degree.

In Australia, intermediate-level courts tend to have a heavy case load, and so many decisions are delivered ex tempore for reasons of time and necessity. Because many decisions are ex tempore, intermediate-level courts' decisions are not binding on inferior courts - that is to say, that in New South Wales, the District Court's decisions are not binding on the Local Court (see Valentine v Eid (1992) 27 NSWLR 615 and stare decisis).

Ex tempore decisions are not binding on later courts due to the quick nature of their delivery after the hearing of a case. Therefore, these decisions are of persuasive authority only and a later court, dealing with a case of similar facts, can reach a different conclusion if it is appropriate and the court in question believes that their decision is more suitable.

See also
 Appeal
 Curia advisari vult
 Reserved decision
 Sub judice
Pro tempore

References

Civil procedure
Judicial legal terminology